Lil' Romeo is the self-titled debut studio album by American rapper, Lil' Romeo. It was released July 3, 2001, on No Limit Records, Soulja Music and Priority Records. The album has features production by Master P, Carlos Stephens and Sean "Barney" Thomas; the album also has guest appearances by Freequan, Silkk the Shocker, Lil' Zane, Allusion, Little D, 6 Piece and Afficial.

The album garnered mixed reviews from music critics. It spawned the singles "My Baby" and "The Girlies". The album debuted at number 6 on the Billboard 200 and was certified Gold the next year.

Reception

Critical reception

Lil' Romeo received a mixed reception from music critics. AllMusic editor Jason Birchmeier praised the album for its "great pop-rap productions" and credited Master P for providing hooks that grabbed your attention. Music critic Robert Christgau gave the album a two-star honorable mention, indicating a "likable effort consumers attuned to its overriding aesthetic or individual vision may well enjoy." He highlighted "My Baby" and "Where They At" as "gangsta pop at its funniest, sickest, and safest." Kathryn McGuire of Rolling Stone commented on how the album was like a creation that Master P made in between his various business projects. An editor from HipHopDX criticized the album for its repetitive material in the songs and Romeo's flow for being "lackluster and underdeveloped."

Commercial performance
The album peaked at number 6 on the Billboard 200 and number 5 on the Top R&B/Hip-Hop Albums, selling 99,000 copies in its first week and spawned the hit single "My Baby", which reached number 3 on the Billboard Hot 100 and number one on the Hot R&B/Hip-Hop Songs music charts. The album was certified Gold by the RIAA for selling over 500,000 copies in the United States of America on March 2, 2002.

Track listing

Sample credits
"My Baby" contains a sample of "I Want You Back" by The Jackson 5
"The Girlies" contains a sample of "Girlz, They Love Me" by Marley Marl
"That's Kool (Remix)" contains a sample of "Stick'em" by The Fat Boys
"Make You Dance" contains samples of "Angel of the Morning" by Chip Taylor and "That's the Way (I Like It)" by KC and the Sunshine Band
"Little Souljas Need Love Too" contains a sample of "Teenage Love" by Slick Rick
"When I Get Grown" contains samples of "Love T.K.O." by Teddy Pendergrass and "Back in the Day" by Ahmad
"What" contains a sample of "What Y'all Want (Remix)" by Eve
"Take My Pain Away" contains a sample of "Take My Breath Away" by Berlin

Personnel
Adapted from the Lil' Romeo liner notes.

Colin Jahn – art direction
Giulio Costanzo – additional graphic design
Tim Alexander and Leslie Henderson – photography
Bernie Grundman – mastering
Howard DeLoach – project coordinator
Music Resources – sample clearance

Charts

Weekly charts

Year-end charts

Certifications

References

2001 debut albums
Romeo Miller albums
No Limit Records albums
Priority Records albums